Sandro Gozi (born 25 March 1968 in Sogliano al Rubicone) is an Italian politician formerly of the Democratic Party who has been a Member of the European Parliament since 2020. He was a member of the Italian Chamber of Deputies from 2006 to 2018 and was elected to the European Parliament in 2019, representing France on the list of Macron's LREM.

Early life and education
After attending high school in Cesena, Sandro Gozi graduated in Law from the University of Bologna in 1992. He then obtained a Diplôme d'études approfondies at SciencesPo in Paris in 1994. In 1996 he defended a PhD in public law in Bologna with a thesis on European comitology. He also holds a master's degree in international politics from Brussels Free University in 1998.

During his university years, Gozi was close to the post-fascist Italian Social Movement of Giorgio Almirante, with whom he is portrayed in a photo. In 1990 he was a member of the Forlì Youth Front, circumstance which he later denied. He claimed to have voted for the first time for the Italian Republican Party.

Early career
Between 1995 and 1996, Gozi worked in Italy's foreign service, dealing with economic relations with the states of the former Yugoslavia, Turkey, Cyprus, Albania and Greece.

He subsequently was an official at the General Secretariat of the European Commission for almost a decade, from 1996–2005, dealing with relations with the European Parliament and then with the negotiation for the adoption of the euro. In 1997 he participated in the negotiations on the Amsterdam Treaty.
From 2000 to 2004 he served as political assistant and member of cabinet of then European Commission President Romano Prodi, and then at the Bureau of European Policy Advisers (BEPA) at the start of the first Barroso Commission.
In 2001 he was also appointed Coordinator for the Stability Pact for South Eastern Europe.
When he returned to Italy in 2005, Gozi initially worked as diplomatic adviser to leftist Nichi Vendola, President of Apulia region. In 2006 he joined Romano Prodi's electoral committee in view of the 2006 elections and served as deputy secretary general of the European Democratic Party.

Gozi has been visiting lecturer at various European universities, including the College of Europe in Bruges (in 2001)  and the European College in Parma, and the Drew University of Madison, New Jersey. From 1999 to 2008 he was director of the ISMaPP institute in Brussels.

Political career

Member of the Italian Parliament, 2006–2018
A member of the national parliament since the 2006 elections (elected in Umbria on the list of L'Ulivo), Gozi again advised then-prime minister Prodi on European politics until 2008 and later served as chairman of the parliamentary committee on Schengen, Europol and immigration affairs.

In 2007 he was one of the founders of the Democratic Party (Italy) (PD) as a member of the national leadership, and elected to the national assembly of the party for the "Democrats for Veltroni" faction.
Between 2008 and 2013, he headed the Democratic Party delegation in the parliamentary committee for European affairs, and he was in charge at national level of EU policies for the Democratic Party.

At the 2008 elections Gozi was re-elected as MP for Umbria for the PD, again serving as head of the party delegation in the parliamentary committee for European affairs. 
At the 2009 party primaries, Gozi served as national manager and Emilia-Romagna coordinator for the Ignazio Marino campaign. Under the new party secretary Pier Luigi Bersani, he then served as president of the "Europe Forum" of the party and head of the "Together for the PD" faction. The following year, in 2010, Bersani appointed him as responsible for Europe in the party secretariat.

In 2010, Gozi launched a domestic campaign to support the appointment of Mario Draghi, the governor of Banca d'Italia, as next President of the European Central Bank.

From 2011 to 2013 Gozi was ambassador for the Rome bid for the 2020 Summer Olympics.

In September 2012 he announced he would run for the centre-left primary election for the office of President of the Council, but he had to withdraw after not being able to collect the required 95 signatures of party delegates.

At the 2013 elections Gozi was elected again as MP for Lombardy for PD.

In addition to his role in parliament, Gozi was a member of the Italian delegation to the Parliamentary Assembly of the Council of Europe from 2013 until 2015. In the Assembly, he served on the Committee on Legal Affairs and Human Rights (2013-2015), the Committee on Political Affairs and Democracy (2013-2014) and the Sub-Committee on Human Rights (2014-2015. During that time, he also served as one of the Assembly's vice-presidents, and since January 2014 as vice-president of the Socialist group in the assembly.

Under-Secretary for European Affairs, 2014–2018 
On 28 February 2014 Gozi joined the Renzi Cabinet as Under-Secretary for European Affairs in the office of Prime Minister Matteo Renzi. Despite not receiving the title of Minister, as his predecessors, Gozi was tasked with coordinating, with the Minister of Foreign Affairs, the six months of Italy's Presidency of the EU Council. In 2014 and 2015 he also signed up as member of the Italian Radicals.

In 2014, Gozi and the French Secretary of State for European Affairs Harlem Désir set out a list of priorities after talks in Paris, saying the European Commission should adopt more growth-friendly economic policies and grant maximum flexibility within existing EU budget rules to countries undertaking growth-promoting investments and structural economic reforms.

In 2015, Gozi called for a two-speed Europe that would let countries which desired closer integration forge ahead. A year later, he said Italy also wanted a single economy minister for the eurozone answerable to elected governments.

At the 2018 elections Gozi was candidate for parliament in his native Emilia-Romagna, where he came in third among the PD candidates and was not elected. 
In November 2018 in Vienna he was elected president of the Union of European Federalists.

In December 2018 Gozi claimed to be working, together with Carlo Calenda and +Europa, on a new party for Matteo Renzi aimed at gathering the votes of "moderates" leaving Forza Italia and of disgruntled grillini.
On 20 September 2019 he announced his departure towards Italia Viva, Matteo Renzi's new centrist party.

In April 2019, together with the Central Bank of San Marino's president Catia Tomasetti, Gozi was investigated by the court of the Republic of San Marino for "unfaithful administration" as part of a "phantom" consultancy for the Central Bank on the "regulatory adjustment to harmonize relations with the EU". On 2 July 2020, Gozi and Tomasetti were fully released from any accusation as it appeared that there was no relevant conduct against them.  In 2021, the Judge responsible for the investigation, Alberto Buriani, has been committed for trial for perjury and attempted concussion against President Tomasetti for facts relating to the aforementioned investigation  as well as breach of investigation secrecy and of professional secrecy, concerning the investigation of Gozi and Tomasetti.

Member of the European Parliament, 2020–present 
For the 2019 European elections, Gozi joined the election campaign in France on the joint Renaissance list of Emmanuel Macron's La République en Marche (LREM) and of centrists MoDem party. 
He participates in the elections while remaining a member of the Italia Viva in Italy.

Gozi was elected among the five French substitute MEPs who were to take the place of British MEPs after Brexit took effect. In the meantime, in late July he was appointed by the government of Édouard Philippe as chargé de mission on European affairs. For this choice he was criticized by Italian politicians, both by representatives of the right-wing government (Luigi Di Maio and Matteo Salvini) and by representatives of his own opposition party (Carlo Calenda).

In October 2019, it was reported that Gozi also worked for Maltese Prime Minister Joseph Muscat; according to Gozi, such consultancy ended when appointed by the French government. Following the controversy, he resigned from office with the French government.

Gozi eventually took office as Member of the European Parliament in February 2020. In parliament, he has since been serving on the Committee on the Internal Market and Consumer Protection and the Committee on Constitutional Affairs. Since 2021, he has been part of the Parliament's delegation to the Conference on the Future of Europe.

In May 2021 he was elected as Secretary General of the European Democratic Party.

In addition to his committee assignments, Gozi is part of the Parliament's delegation for relations with the Mashreq countries. He is also a member of the Spinelli Group and the European Parliament Intergroup on LGBT Rights.

Other activities
 European Council on Foreign Relations (ECFR), Member
 Italy-India Association, President 
 Spinelli Group, Member of the Steering Group

References

External links

 http://www.sandrogozi.it
 http://www.spinelligroup.eu

1968 births
Living people
People from Sogliano al Rubicone
Democratic Party (Italy) politicians
Recipients of the Ordre des Palmes Académiques
Government ministers of Italy
MEPs for France 2019–2024
Italia Viva politicians